The 2003 Ukrainian Amateur Cup  was the eighth annual season of Ukraine's football knockout competition for amateur football teams. The competition started on 9 August 2003 and concluded on 19 October 2003.

Competition schedule

First round (1/8)

Quarterfinals (1/4)
This year only Pivdenstal Yenakieve received a bye to quarterfinals.

Semifinals (1/2)

Final

See also
 2003 Ukrainian Football Amateur League
 2003–04 Ukrainian Cup

External links
 2003 Ukrainian Amateur Cup at the Footpass (Football Federation of Ukraine)

2003
Amateur Cup
Ukrainian Amateur Cup